Carl Jonnevold ( June 1, 1856 - June 9, 1955) was a Norwegian-born American  landscape artist. 

Carl Henrik Jonnevold  emigrated to the United States in the 1880s.  By 1887 he settled in 
California and opened a studio San Francisco, first on California Street and later on Kearny Street. He was a self taught artist who exhibited principally in local galleries.

References

1856 births
1955 deaths
Artists from San Francisco
Norwegian emigrants to the United States
19th-century American painters
19th-century Norwegian painters
19th-century male artists
20th-century American painters
20th-century Norwegian painters